Tetramethylethylenediamine (TMEDA or TEMED) is a chemical compound with the formula (CH3)2NCH2CH2N(CH3)2.  This species is derived from ethylenediamine by replacement of the four amine hydrogens with four methyl groups.  It is a colorless liquid, although old samples often appear yellow. Its odor is similar to that of rotting fish.

As a reagent in synthesis
TMEDA is widely employed as a ligand for metal ions. It forms stable complexes with many metal halides, e.g. zinc chloride and copper(I) iodide, giving complexes that are soluble in organic solvents. In such complexes, TMEDA serves as a bidentate ligand.

TMEDA has an affinity for lithium ions. When mixed with n-butyllithium, TMEDA's nitrogen atoms coordinate to the lithium, forming a cluster of higher reactivity than the tetramer or hexamer that n-butyllithium normally adopts. BuLi/TMEDA is able to metallate or even doubly metallate many substrates including benzene, furan, thiophene, N-alkylpyrroles, and ferrocene. Many anionic organometallic complexes have been isolated as their [Li(tmeda)2]+ complexes. In such complexes [Li(tmeda)2]+ behaves like a quaternary ammonium salt, such as [NEt4]+.

sec-Butyllithium/TMEDA is a useful combination in organic synthesis where the n-butyl analogue adds to substrate. TMEDA is still capable of forming a metal complex with Li in this case as mentioned above.

Other uses
The complexes (TMEDA)Ni(CH3)2 and [(TMEDA)Ni(o-tolyl)Cl] illustrate the use of tmeda to stabilize homogeneous catalysts.

References

Dimethylamino compounds
Chelating agents
Foul-smelling chemicals